Katranlık is a village in the Hassa District, Hatay Province, Turkey. The village had a population of 619 in 2022.

In late 19th century, German orientalist Martin Hartmann listed the village as a settlement inhabited by Turks.

References

Villages in Hassa District